The Northam Advertiser was a newspaper published in Northam, Western Australia. It was published from 1895 to 1986. Between 1956 and 1959, it was titled the Northam Advertiser-News.
The editorial stance of the newspaper after its founding was studied by a Graylands Teachers College student in the 1960s, and the newspaper was involved in commentating upon the turbulent first ten years of the twentieth century in Western Australian politics following the "post-Forrest era".

Digitisation 
Digitised editions of The Northam Advertiser from 1895 to 1915 and from 1948 to 1954 are available on Trove at the National Library of Australia.

References

External links
 

Defunct newspapers published in Western Australia
Northam, Western Australia
Publications established in 1895
Publications disestablished in 1959